The Shabot Obaadjiwan First Nation, formerly known as the Sharbot Mishigama Anishinabe Algonquin First Nation and as the Sharbot Lake Algonquin First Nation, is a non-status Algonquin (Anishinaabe) community located north of Kingston, Ontario.  It is currently in negotiation with the federal and provincial governments over claims to Aboriginal title in the area.  Its chief is Doreen Davis.

The Sharbot community was offered a reservation in Bedford Township in 1844, but declined it.  "Our families chose not to go to a reserve," Chief Davis said in a 2000 interview.  "They just thought it was an awful place and they chose to stay with their non-native friends in the community."

In 2007 and 2008, the Shabot Obaadjiwan First Nation worked closely with the Ardoch Algonquin First Nation to oppose uranium exploration in the Sharbot Lake area.  Both communities took part in a non-violent blockade of a proposed mining site, and were involved in legal action against the prospecting company Frontenac Ventures.

References

External links
Ardoch Algonquin First Nation+Shabot Obaadjiwan First Nation press releases
Shabot Obaadjiwan First Nation

First Nations in Ontario
Algonquin
Non-Status Indians